The Minnesota–Minnesota Duluth men's ice hockey rivalry is a college ice hockey rivalry between the Minnesota Golden Gophers men's ice hockey and Minnesota Duluth Bulldogs men's ice hockey programs. The first meeting between the two occurred on 13 December 1952 but wasn't played annually until 1962.

History
Minnesota was one for the first 'western' teams to play college ice hockey when they held their first official game in January of 1922. Less than a decade later, Duluth State Teachers College founded their own varsity team, however, due in part to the Great Depression, the program lasted only two years before being mothballed. After World War II the school decided to being the team back and they began playing in the MIAC. Over the succeeding 15 years, the two teams only played a single game against one another, primarily because MIAC teams were considered 'lower-tier' programs and the University of Minnesota was among the 'higher-tier' clubs.

In 1961, after winning 9 consecutive MIAC championships, UMD decided to raise the profile of its ice hockey program and left the MIAC. Over the next four years, while playing as an independent, the Bulldogs began an annual series with Minnesota and quickly gained acceptance by the other western programs. Minnesota Duluth joined the WCHA in 1965 and became a conference rival of Minnesota's for most of the next fifty years. During this period, Minnesota had a decided advantage in terms of wins and losses though Duluth got their fair share as well.

In 2013, as a result of the Big Ten Conference forming an ice hockey division, Minnesota and Minnesota Duluth ended up in different conferences. To help continue their long-standing rivalry, the North Star College Cup was organized between four schools from Minnesota. Unfortunately, there wasn't enough interest in the tournament to keep it going after four years. Instead, the two programs began holding a home-and-home series at the beginning of the year. They have done so every years beginning in 2017 with the exception of the 2020–21 season. That year the series was not allowed due to the moratorium on non-conference play resulting from the COVID-19 pandemic.

Game results
Full game results for the rivalry, with rankings beginning in the 1998–99 season.

Series facts

References

External links
 Minnesota Golden Gophers men's ice hockey
 Minnesota Duluth Bulldogs men's ice hockey

College ice hockey rivalries in the United States
Minnesota Golden Gophers men's ice hockey
Minnesota Duluth Bulldogs men's ice hockey
1952 establishments in Minnesota